Nick is a German free-to-air television channel for children, part of the international Nickelodeon brand. Originally launched in 1995, and relaunched in 2005, Nickelodeon is based in Berlin. The channel is available on subscription services and as an unscrambled, free-to-air (FTA) satellite signal. On 31 March 2010, the channel re-adopted the name Nickelodeon on air and online, in addition to the new Nickelodeon logo and graphical package being rolled out internationally at the time. Since then, the channel is also broadcast in English in addition to German on a secondary audio track.

Unlike other Nickelodeon feeds and like the Dutch and African counterparts, the end credits on shows never appear. They were replaced by short credits including the show name, production year and production company.

Nicknight

Nicknight was a German, Austrian and Swiss programming block operating from 2014 to 2021. On 1 November 2018, Nicknight Germany rebranded into MTV+ (Comedy Central +1 since 1 March 2021). Like it was done in Germany, Nicknight stopped broadcasting in Switzerland and Austria on 1 October 2021, instead they were both replaced by Comedy Central Austria and 7+ Family.

History

1995–1998
The original version of Nickelodeon was launched on 5 July 1995 on the DFS Kopernikus satellite and a few cable providers in North Rhine-Westphalia. Nickelodeon initially aired for six hours per day from 1.00pm to 7.00pm on weekdays and 8.00 am to 1.00pm on weekends; during off-air hours, the channel looped a half-hour special featuring excerpts from its shows. Breaks between programmes were interspersed with live presentation from the Düsseldorf studios, known as the Nick Live Club. Starting in October 1995, Nickelodeon aired from 6.00am until 8.00pm, and timeshared with Arte starting in 1996, truncating its broadcast to 5.00pm, and later 7.00pm. 

After state-run Der Kinderkanal launched, Nickelodeon lost its valuable slot on many cable providers and started timesharing with VH-1 Germany on satellite between 6.00am and 8.00pm. Nickelodeon was a financial failure and lost 150,000,000 Deutsche Mark due to weak advertising sales and its inability to compete against the more successful Kinderkanal. The channel's future had been deliberated since the beginning of 1998 and its closure had been planned months in advance. Viacom announced it with only days of notice given to employees. During the station's final three days, a testcard aired after each programme informing viewers of its impending closure. Nickelodeon closed on 31 May 1998 at the regular time of 8.00pm with a montage thanking viewers and informing them Nickelodeon's programming would soon be available elsewhere. Its transponder space was occupied with an edited version of the testcard in the following weeks, before MTV was relocated to the transponder the following year.

Viacom soon thereafter struck a deal with RTL owner CLT-UFA To broadcast their programming on RTL's own children's channel, Super RTL, in addition to a weekend morning Nicktoons block on the main RTL channel. After VH-1 Germany shut down in 2001 (and was replaced by a pan-European feed on a separate channel), it was replaced with MTV2 Pop.

Relaunch, 2005–2010
On 7 April 2005 it was announced that Nickelodeon Germany will be relaunched under the name Nick as a new channel on 12 September 2005. Nick started with a prime-time programming block called Nick Comedy that aired sitcoms and other comedy shows. Nickelodeon eventually replaced MTV2 Pop; since February 2006, in addition to international series, it started airing locally produced shows. In October 2007 a special German version of the Nickelodeon Kids' Choice Awards was produced and broadcast on the channel.

In the start of 2008, Nick launched a family-oriented programming block named  (Nick after eight), which was the local adaptation of US overnight block Nick at Nite. It aired documentaries, drama series, films and sitcoms. It used an adapted logo of its US counterpart. Most of the block's programming schedule consisted on repeats of Ren and Stimpy and CatDog. On 15 December 2008, Comedy Central Germany replaced Nick nach acht on Nickelodeon, taking over its airing time as a timeshared channel starting 8.15pm.

2010s 
On 31 March 2010, the channel adopted the new international branding. Nick was renamed Nickelodeon, while Nick Premium was rebranded as Nicktoons.

Since 1 June 2011, Nickelodeon Germany started broadcasting in HD. A new logo was used from January 2012, as well as a new graphic package.

From 1 October 2014, Nickelodeon Germany turned itself into a 24-hour channel, with Comedy Central leaving Nick's channel slot and moving to VIVA Germany. Furthermore, Nickelodeon introduced a new overnight programming block called Nicknight, replacing Comedy Central's airing time from 9.00pm to 5.45am.

Since 28 June 2017 the channel returned to its previous name, Nick.

On 1 November 2018 at 5am, Nicknight was discontinued. At 8.15pm on that day MTV+ launched airing from 8.15pm to 5am. Nicknight does not exist anymore in Germany, however, the Austrian and Swiss feeds still kept the Nicknight brand until 1 October 2021 with them being replaced by Comedy Central Austria and 7+ Family.

2020s 
On 1 March 2021, MTV+ was replaced by Comedy Central +1.

Other feeds

Austrian channel

Since 1 June 2006, an Austrian subfeed of the channel is also being broadcast, initially timesharing with VIVA Austria from 6.00am to 7.00pm. On 1 January 2011, it starts timesharing with Comedy Central Austria. The channel is known on-air as Nickelodeon Austria.

From 1 October 2014, Nick Austria starts also to broadcast 24 hours per day with the launch of NickNight.

Since 1 October 2021, the channel started timesharing with Comedy Central Austria, along with a new licence from RRtv, using the European graphics package, its schedule and its original name, Nickelodeon.

Swiss channel

A Swiss subfeed for German-speaking viewers was launched on 1 April 2009, first timesharing with VIVA Switzerland and then with Comedy Central starting in 16 May 2011. For many years, its programming schedule was identical with the main, German feed. Nevertheless, it got its own, separate schedule. The channel is known on-air as Nick Schweiz.

From 1 October 2014, Nick Switzerland starts also to broadcast 24 hours per day with the launch of NickNight.

Since 1 October 2021, the channel has been run by CH Media under license from Paramount.

Sister channels

Nicktoons

Nicktoons was launched in December 2007 as Nick Premium. In 2009, Nickelodeon announced that Nick Premium would be rebranded as Nicktoons. The channel airs animated programmes from Nickelodeon.

Nick Jr.

Nick Jr. is a channel that broadcasts to younger kids. The channel was launched on 12 September 2005 as a block and on 31 March 2009 as a channel. Before the channel launched, some programmes were broadcast on Super RTL and Disney Channel.

References

External links
 www.nick.de
 www.nickelodeon.at
 www.nick.ch

Germany
Children's television networks
Television channels and stations established in 1995
Television channels and stations disestablished in 1998
Television channels and stations established in 2005
Re-established companies
Television stations in Berlin
1995 establishments in Germany
1998 disestablishments in Germany
2005 establishments in Germany
Television stations in Austria